The Valongo Observatory (Observatório do Valongo) is the astronomical observatory of the UFRJ.  It is located on the top of the Conceição Hill, an old settlement in the downtown of Rio de Janeiro dating from the first centuries of the colonization of the city. The observatory hosts the Astronomy Undergraduation Course and the Astronomy Graduate School of this university.

See also
 List of astronomical observatories

References

Astronomical observatories in Brazil
Buildings and structures in Rio de Janeiro (city)